Elise Herz, née von Lämel (1788–1868) was a Prague-born Austrian philanthropist. There she was made an honorary member of the Jewish community. Her father was the merchant Simon von Lämel. Her home in Prague was an intellectual center; however, upon her husband's death in 1850, she moved to Vienna.

Herz founded a children's asylum in Jerusalem, mainly for Jewish children, but a few Christian and Muslim children were accepted as well. Ludwig August Frankl was commissioned to organize it. This entry from the 1906 Jewish Encyclopedia about a "children's asylum" refers to the school she founded in her father's memory in the Zikhron Moshe neighbourhood of the city, better known as the Simon von Lämel School or simply Lämel School.

References

Austrian philanthropists
Austrian Jews
Austrian nobility
1788 births
1868 deaths
19th-century philanthropists